The Circus Kid is a 1928 American silent drama film directed by George B. Seitz. Although it was a silent film, it contained some talking sequences, synchronized music and sound effects. A print of the film exists.

Cast
 Frankie Darro as Buddy
 Poodles Hanneford as Poodles
 Joe E. Brown as King Kruger
 Helene Costello as Trixie
 Sam Nelson as Tad
 Lionel Belmore as Beezicks
 Charles Miller as Cadwallader
 John Gough as Skelly Crosley (as Johnny Gough)
 Syd Crossley as Skelly's Runner (as Sid Crosley)
 Charles Gemora as Zozo, the Gorilla

References

External links

1928 films
1928 drama films
Silent American drama films
American silent feature films
Films directed by George B. Seitz
Transitional sound films
American black-and-white films
Film Booking Offices of America films
Circus films
1920s American films